Pszczew  is a village in Międzyrzecz County, Lubusz Voivodeship, in western Poland. It is the seat of the gmina (administrative district) called Gmina Pszczew.

The village has a population of 1,826. It gives its name to the protected area known as the Pszczew Landscape Park.

History 
As a result of the Partitions of Poland, Pszczew came under Prussian rule. It was temporarily recovered by the Poles from 1807 to 1815, when it belonged to the Duchy of Warsaw, but became part of Prussia once again in 1815, within the Grand Duchy of Posen and after 1848, the Province of Posen.

In 1871, it became part of the German Empire. In 1887, it gained a railway connection with Międzyrzecz (zhen: Meseritz) and Międzychód (then: Birnbaum). Pszczew, despite being located in the heavily Germanized western borderlands of Greater Poland, had a majority Polish population. In 1890, only 19.5% of the 1,964 inhabitants were Protestants. The Polish People's Bank also operated in Pszczew. However, after Poland regained independence in the aftermath of World War I, the Treaty of Versailles left the town within the borders of Germany. From 1922 to 1938, it was part of the Frontier March of Posen-West Prussia and from 1938 to 1945, it was part of the Province of Brandenburg.

After World War II, Pszczew was returned to Poland and the remaining German inhabitants were expelled.

External links 
 Jewish Community in Pszczew on Virtual Shtetl

References

Pszczew